James Alexander Chase Stokes (born September 16, 1992) is an American actor. He is known for his role as John Booker Routledge (John B) in the Netflix teen drama series Outer Banks.

Early life
Stokes was born in Annapolis, Maryland, the only child of Jeff Stokes and Jennifer Canning. His parents divorced when he was several months old. Stokes subsequently moved with his mother to Canton, Georgia, and later to Orlando, Florida as a teenager where he attended Timber Creek High School. He received his bachelor's degree at Valencia College and later attended University of Central Florida and Seminole State College. Growing up, he aspired to become a professional ice hockey player.

Career
Stokes had small roles in television at the beginning of his acting career, including Stranger Things, Daytime Divas, and Tell Me Your Secrets.

He originally turned down an offer to audition for Outer Banks in February 2019, before reading for the role of Topper and later John B. The first season was released on April 15, 2020, to positive reviews, and a second season was confirmed in July.

That same month, it was announced that he would be playing TJ in One Of Us Is Lying. However, after filming the pilot in 2019, it was announced that Chase would not return due to a scheduling conflict with the second season of Outer Banks and he was replaced.

In September 2021, Stokes and Madelyn Cline starred in the music video for Kygo and Donna Summer's single "Hot Stuff".

Personal life
In June 2020, Stokes announced that he was in a relationship with his Outer Banks co-star Madelyn Cline. The couple split in October 2021. Stokes has been in a relationship with country superstar Kelsea Ballerini since December 2022.

Filmography

References

External links
 

1992 births
Living people
21st-century American actors
People from Annapolis, Maryland
Timber Creek High School alumni
Actors from Maryland